Gvardeyskoye is a rural locality (a settlement) in Bagrationovsky District of Kaliningrad Oblast, Russia, located approximately  north of Bagrationovsk, the administrative center of the district, and  south of Kaliningrad, the administrative center of the oblast.

History
It was founded by the Teutonic Knights in the Old Prussian region of Natangia as a location of a mill (mühle means a mill) and a church, first mentioned in 1372. In 1454, the region was incorporated by King Casimir IV Jagiellon to the Kingdom of Poland upon the request of the anti-Teutonic Prussian Confederation. After the subsequent Thirteen Years' War, since 1466, it formed part of Poland as a fief held by the Teutonic Order, and then held by Ducal Prussia after the secularization of the Order in 1525. It was given as a pawn by the Order to Daniel von Kunheim in 1474. The laird Georg von Kunheim, a student at Wittenberg, married Martin Luther's youngest daughter Margarethe Luther in 1555; she died in Mühlhausen in 1570. Two paintings of Luther and his wife Katharina von Bora by Lucas Cranach existed at the church up to 1945, as well as the original summons of Martin Luther by Emperor Charles V to the Diet of Worms and an original letter, written by Luther.

The settlement became a part of the Kingdom of Prussia in 1701, and from 1871 it was also part of Germany. In 1643, Mühlhausen came into the property of the von Kalckstein family until 1826, also as advowson of the Church.

Conquered by the Red Army during World War II, Mühlhausen was transferred from Germany to the Soviet Union according to the 1945 Potsdam Conference and had its German population expelled, also in accordance to the Potsdam Conference. It was given its present name by the Soviets.

The formerly ruined church was rebuilt after 1994.

Population
1820: 353
1846: 454
1871: 670
1895: 662
1930: 576
1939: 939 (after the incorporation of Knauten)

Notable people
 Caspar Hennenberger (1529–1600), cartographer, Lutheran pastor
 Albrecht von Kalckstein (1592-1667), Prussian count
 Christian Ludwig von Kalckstein (1630–1672)
 Christoph Wilhelm von Kalckstein (1682-1759), educator of Frederick the Great
 Ludwig Karl von Kalckstein (1725-1800), Prussian count and field marshal
 Karl Georg Otto Willibald von Kalckstein (1812-1894), politician
 Johann Friedrich Schultz, German philosopher

References

Bibliography
Horst Schulz, Der Kreis Pr. Eylau, Verden/Aller 1983

External links

The Church in 2002 (p. 12) 
color picture of the church in 1943

Rural localities in Kaliningrad Oblast